Martha Dodray is a  front-line polio worker from Indian state of Bihar. In 2013, she  was awarded a United Nations Foundation award for her work in protecting children from polio. She was invited for the Global Leadership Awards Dinner of 2013 hosted by the UN Foundation. Subsequently, in 2014 she was selected for the National Florence Nightingale Award in 2014.

References

living people
polio
social workers from Bihar
year of birth missing (living people)